Carmen is a 1953 Italian-Spanish drama film directed by Giuseppe Maria Scotese and starring Ana Esmeralda, Fausto Tozzi and Mariella Lotti. It is based on Prosper Mérimée's novel Carmen.

Plot 
A Panamanian cargo ship docks at night at a dock on the Guadalquivir River. José, chief officer of Italian origin, is on duty on the ship. Carmen, an attractive gypsy from Granada, who works in Seville with a gang of tobacco smugglers, comes up on deck and begins to dance to distract the attention of the men on board, thus allowing her cronies to unload the merchandise from the ship. However, the police discover the operation and intervene. Carmen manages to flee from the investigations thanks to the protection of José, who falls madly in love with her.

Cast

References

Bibliography

External links 
 

1953 drama films
Italian drama films
Spanish drama films
1953 films
1950s Italian-language films
Films based on Carmen
Films directed by Giuseppe Maria Scotese
Suevia Films films
Spanish black-and-white films
Italian black-and-white films
1950s Italian films